Carol Meehan may refer to:

 Carol Foley, a character from the Irish soap opera Fair City, who - while married to Billy Meehan - was known by this name
 Carol Anne Meehan (born 1956), news anchor formerly at CJOH